Agapema solita is a species of moth in the family Saturniidae. It was discovered in 1972.

References 

Saturniidae
Moths described in 1972